The New Bonnet is a mid 19th-century painting by American artist Francis William Edmonds. Done in oil on canvas, the painting depicts a woman receiving a new bonnet. The work is on display in the Metropolitan Museum of Art.

Description 
Bonnet depicts a familial scene in which a woman opens a new bonnet. Edmonds included a number of specific details in his work to comment on contemporaneous American consumerism; for example, the family (a woman, her mother and father) are shown to be part of the middle class, and are presented as being shocked by the price of the bonnet but oblivious to the poverty of the lower class girl (first from left) who delivered the garment. In addition, the mother (first from right) is implied to be vain as she possess a mirror, while the father (second from right) is implied to be a drunk by the presence of wine bottle and filled glass on the mantel behind him. 

Edmonds may have modeled his painting on the works of the 17th century Dutch masters.

References 

1858 paintings
Paintings in the collection of the Metropolitan Museum of Art